Öxnehaga Church is a church building at Öxnehaga in Huskvarna in Sweden. Belonging to the Huskvarna Parish of the Church of Sweden, it was inaugurated on 27 November 1976, which was the Saturday before the First Advent Sunday that year.

References

20th-century Church of Sweden church buildings
Churches in Jönköping Municipality
Churches completed in 1976
Huskvarna
Churches in the Diocese of Växjö
1976 establishments in Sweden